Archips opiparus is a species of moth of the family Tortricidae. It is found in the Chinese provinces of Guizhou, Hunan, Sichuan and Yunnan.

The length of the forewings is 8–10 mm for males and about 8 mm for females. The forewings are brown with a reddish-brown and dark-brown pattern. The hindwings are greyish brown, but apricot yellow at the apex.

References

Moths described in 1987
Archips
Moths of Asia